Pseudomonas entomophila is a strain of bacterium that lives in the soil and can infect insects. It is closely related to Pseudomonas putida.

References

External links
Type strain of Pseudomonas entomophila at BacDive -  the Bacterial Diversity Metadatabase

Pseudomonadales